Sulfur carrier protein ThiS adenylyltransferase (thiF (gene)) is an enzyme with systematic name ATP:(ThiS) adenylyltransferase. This enzyme catalyses the following chemical reaction

 ATP + [ThiS]  diphosphate + adenylyl-[ThiS]

This enzyme binds Zn2+. The enzyme catalyses the adenylation of ThiS, a sulfur carrier protein involved in the biosynthesis of thiamine.

References

External links 

EC 2.7.7